The Best American Mystery and Suspense is an annual anthology of North American mystery and thriller stories. Part of The Best American Series since 1997, it is published by Empire Books, an imprint of HarperCollins. Prior to 2021, its title was The Best American Mystery Stories and it was published by Houghton Mifflin.

Works for each edition are selected like the other The Best American Series titles, whereby a series editor chooses about 50 candidates from which a guest editor picks about 20 for publication. Runners-up are listed in the appendix. The editor of the series during 1997–2020, Otto Penzler, defined eligible mystery stories as "any work of fiction in which a crime or the threat of a crime is central to the theme or plot" and only considered those that had been written by an American or Canadian and published for the first time during the previous calendar year in an American or Canadian publication.

Series editors 

 Otto Penzler (1997–2020)
 Steph Cha (2021–)

Guest editors

 1997: Robert B. Parker
 1998: Sue Grafton 
 1999: Ed McBain
 2000: Donald Westlake
 2001: Lawrence Block
 2002: James Ellroy
 2003: Michael Connelly
 2004: Nelson DeMille
 2005: Joyce Carol Oates
 2006: Scott Turow
 2007: Carl Hiaasen
 2008: George Pelecanos
 2009: Jeffery Deaver
 2010: Lee Child
 2011: Harlan Coben
 2012: Robert Crais
 2013: Lisa Scottoline
 2014: Laura Lippman
 2015: James Patterson
 2016: Elizabeth George
 2017: John Sandford
 2018: Louise Penny
 2019: Jonathan Lethem
 2020: C. J. Box
 2021: Alafair Burke

See also
The Best American Mystery Stories 1997
The Best American Mystery Stories 2003
The Best American Mystery Stories 2009

References

Book series introduced in 1997
Mystery Stories
Publications established in 1997
Houghton Mifflin books